The 1980 Wellington City mayoral election was part of the New Zealand local elections held that same year. In 1980, election were held for the Mayor of Wellington plus other local government positions including eighteen city councillors. The polling was conducted using the standard first-past-the-post electoral method.

Background
The election saw Michael Fowler returned as mayor for a third term as well as the introduction of a third party to contest control of the council. The Rates Reform ticket debuted to challenge the long established council duopoly between the Labour and Citizens' tickets. The group performed poorly however with all candidates receiving far fewer votes than the other tickets' candidates. By the following election the Rates Reform group had merged into the Citizens Association and two of their 1980 candidates (Ruth Gotlieb and Bryan Weyburne) were elected as councillors.

Mayoralty results

Councillor results

References

Mayoral elections in Wellington
1980 elections in New Zealand
Politics of the Wellington Region
October 1980 events in New Zealand
1980s in Wellington